Altoona Armory is a historic National Guard armory located at Logan Township, Blair County, Pennsylvania.  The main armory building was built in 1938, and was an "I"-plan building in the Moderne style.  The front section housed administrative functions and the rear was the former two-story stable area for the cavalry unit.  Between these sections was the riding hall, which had a round arched roof.  It was one of nine armories built in Pennsylvania between 1912 and 1938.  Demolished.

It was added to the National Register of Historic Places in 1991.

References

Armories on the National Register of Historic Places in Pennsylvania
Moderne architecture in Pennsylvania
Infrastructure completed in 1938
Buildings and structures in Blair County, Pennsylvania
National Register of Historic Places in Blair County, Pennsylvania